Tamiment is an unincorporated community located in Lehman Township in Pike County, Pennsylvania, United States. Tamiment is located along Bushkill Falls Road, north of Bushkill.

References

Unincorporated communities in Pike County, Pennsylvania
Unincorporated communities in Pennsylvania